Out of Bounds is the second full-length album by Swedish melodic punk rock band No Fun at All, released on 10 October 1995.

This LP brought more of the skate punk style No Fun At All helped pioneer. It was well received by fans, but the band felt the album lacked an edge.

Track listing
All music written by Mikael Danielsson. All lyrics written by Ingemar Jansson & Mikael Danielsson. Arrangements by No Fun At All.

"Beat 'em Down"  – 2:28
"Master Celebrator"  – 2:52
"Perfection"  – 2:27
"In a Rhyme" - 2:16 †
"Pleasure is to be Insane" – 2:44 †
"Nothing Personal"  – 2:22
"Don't Pass Me By" – 2:07 †
"I Have Seen"  – 3:30
"Out of Bounds" – 2:38
"Talking to Remind Me" – 4:13
"In a Moment" – 2:07
"Trapped Inside" – 2:14
"Invitation" – 1:59
"Stranded" – 2:22

† = Backing vocals provided by departed and founding member of NFAA Jimmie Olsson.

Lineup
Kjell Ramstedt - drums
Mikael Danielsson - rhythm guitar
Ingemar Jansson - vocals
Krister Johansson - lead guitar
Henrik Sunvisson - bass

References 

1995 albums
No Fun at All albums
Burning Heart Records albums